Banksia undata, commonly known as urchin dryandra, is a species of shrub that is endemic to the southwest of Western Australia. It has sessile, wedge-shaped, wavy, serrated leaves, pale yellow flowers in heads of between 80 and 160, and later up to eight follicles in each head.

Description
Banksia undata is a shrub that typically grows to a height of  but does not form a lignotuber. There are between four and nine irregular teeth on each side of the leaves.

Taxonomy and naming
This species was first formally described in 1848 by Swiss botanist Carl Meissner who gave it the name Dryandra praemorsa and published the description in Lehmann's Plantae Preissianae from specimens collected by James Drummond near the Swan River.

In 1996, Alex George describe two varieties of D. praemorsa:

In 2007 Austin Mast and Kevin Thiele transferred all dryandras to the genus Banksia. As there was already a plant named Banksia praemorsa (cut-leaf banksia), Mast and Thiele were forced to choose a new specific epithet; their choice, "undata", is from the Latin undatus ("undulate"), in reference to the wavy leaves. The names of the two varieties, var. splendens and var. undata are accepted by the Australian Plant Census.

Distribution and habitat
Urchin dryandra occurs between Clackline, Dwellingup and Bannister where it grows in jarrah forest. Variety splendens is found from the Brookton Highway south to Bannister and var. undata between Clackline and Dwellingup.

Ecology
An assessment of the potential impact of climate change on this species found that its range is likely to contract by between 50% and 80% by 2080, depending on the severity of the change.

Conservation status
Banksia undata and its two varieties are classified as "not threatened" by the Western Australian Government Department of Parks and Wildlife.

References

undata
Plants described in 1848
Taxa named by Carl Meissner